Canadian Amp is a 2001 EP by Neko Case.

The recording features Case performing four covers of material by Canadian songwriters, along with a Hank Williams cover, a traditional folk song and two original songs written by Case (one of which was in collaboration with The Sadies).

Guest musicians include Andrew Bird, Jon Rauhouse, Kelly Hogan, Brett Sparks and Chris Von Sneidern.

The disc was originally a tour-only release; however, it later received wider circulation.

Track listing
"Andy" (Mike O'Neill) – 1:40
"Dreaming Man" (Neil Young) – 3:46
"Knock Loud" (Sook-Yin Lee) – 3:08 
"Make Your Bed" (Case, The Sadies) – 3:15
"Poor Ellen Smith"  (Traditional) – 2:17 
"In California"  (Lisa Marr) – 3:29
"Alone and Forsaken" (Hank Williams) – 2:42
"Favorite" (Case) – 3:17

Personnel 

 Andrew Bird – Violin
 Neko Case – Vocals, electric and acoustic tenor guitars, producer, engineer, mixing, photography, drawing, recording
 Mike Hagler – Producer, engineer, mastering
 Kelly Hogan – Vocal harmony
 Andy Hopkins – Guitar (acoustic), guitar (electric)
 Jon Rauhouse – Guitar (acoustic), banjo, engineer, Hawaiian guitar, pedal steel banjo, recording
 Tom Ray – Bass (upright), banjo-ukulele
 Brett Sparks – Vocals
 Chris Von Sneidern – Guitar (12 string acoustic)

References

Neko Case EPs
2001 EPs
Covers EPs